Menasha (YTB-773) was a United States Navy  named for Menasha, Wisconsin.

Construction

The contract for Menasha was awarded 25 June 1963. She was laid down at Oyster Bay, Long Island, New York, by Jakobson Shipyard and launched 4 November 1964.  Her sponsor was Mrs. E. J. Stock.

Operational history
Menasha was assigned to the 5th Naval District, Norfolk, Virginia. She was reclassified YTM‑761 in September 1965.  In the summer of 1966, Menasha was assigned to the 4th Naval District and the Philadelphia Naval Shipyard.

On 15 June 1986, Menasha was placed out of service and transferred to the Maritime Administration.  Other sources indicate that Menasha was transferred to the National Defense Reserve Fleet in 1986, St. Lawrence SDC in 1989, sold as Menasha in 1995, and is now Escorte.

Notes

Menasha was sunk in the St. Lawrence River near Ogdensburg, NY, and refloated c; 08/10/1992

References 

 
 

Natick-class large harbor tugs
1964 ships
Ships built in Oyster Bay, New York